The 2018 Romanian Masters was a non-ranking snooker tournament that took place from 14 to 18 March 2018 in Bucharest, Romania. Sanctioned by World Snooker, the tournament was organised by McCann/Thiess Events and McCann Bucharest and was a 16-player invitational event.

12 of the world's top 16 players returned to Romania, after Bucharest staged the 2016 European Masters in the 2016/2017 season.

Ryan Day won his third trophy of the 2017/2018 season, beating Stuart Bingham 10–8 in the final.

Main draw

Notes
* Mark King replaced 4th seed Shaun Murphy after the draw had taken place.

Final

Century breaks

Total: 11

 137, 124, 111  Stuart Bingham 
 136, 133  Ali Carter
 130  Mark Allen
 120  Ryan Day
 118, 101  Judd Trump
 109, 108  Stephen Maguire

References

Snooker non-ranking competitions
Romanian
Snooker Masters
Snooker in Romania
Sports competitions in Bucharest
Romanian